Captain Claude Champion de Crespigny, DSO (11 September 1873 – 18 May 1910) was a British soldier and polo player.

Early life
He was the eldest, and heir apparent, of nine children born to the former Louisa Margaret McKerrall, and Sir Claude Champion de Crespigny, 4th Baronet (1847–1935), who went bankrupt in 1881.

His paternal grandparents were Sir Claude Champion de Crespigny, 3rd Baronet, the first-class cricketer and British Army officer, and the former Mary Tyrell (a daughter of Sir John Tyrell, 2nd Baronet). His paternal grandparents were Robert McKerrall, Emily Pauline Staveley.

Claude was educated at Eton.

Career

He joined the British Army when he was commissioned a second lieutenant in the 2nd Life Guards on 3 July 1895, and was promoted to lieutenant on 5 August 1896.

He served in the Second Boer War in South Africa from 1899 to 1900, and was twice wounded in action and twice recommended for the Victoria Cross for acts of immense bravery. Though he never received this decoration, he was appointed a Companion of the Distinguished Service Order (DSO) for his services in South Africa in November 1900.

Following the war, he received the substantive rank of Captain in his regiment on 12 January 1902, then served in West Africa in 1903.

He later became the Aide-de-Camp to the Viceroy and Governor-General of India George Curzon, 1st Marquess Curzon of Kedleston.

Sporting
Claude was a member of a very sporting family and was a successful polo player, he was selected for the Hurlingham Club team that traveled to compete in America in 1910. He won the Roehampton Cup in 1907 and 1908. It was said that he "can hunt like a hound, swim like a fish, run like a hare, and box like Jeffries."

Personal life

In 1904, he served as best man at the wedding of Herbert Spender-Clay (who attended Eton at the same time as Crespigny) to heiress Pauline Astor, the eldest daughter of William Waldorf Astor (later 1st Viscount Astor).

On 18 May 1910 Claude committed suicide age 37, and was found dead by the roadside at King's Cliffe in Northamptonshire. Claude had arrived at King's Cliffe from London the night before and upon his arrival, had "set out to walk in the direction of Apethorpe Hall, the residence of Leonard Brassey and Lady Violet Brassey, where he had been an occasional visitor." The physician and coroner concluded that a temporary madness may have been caused by influenza and repeated heavy falls whilst playing polo. His younger brother, Claude Raul, became the fifth Baronet upon their father's death in 1935.

References
Notes

Sources

External links

Claude Champion de Crespigny (1873–1910) at Art UK

English polo players
Companions of the Distinguished Service Order
British Life Guards officers
British Army personnel of the Second Boer War
1910 deaths
1873 births
People educated at Eton College
Suicides by firearm in England
British military personnel who committed suicide
Younger sons of baronets
1910 suicides